Araricá is a municipality in Rio Grande do Sul, Brazil.  The town was incorporated from Sapiranga in  1996.

References 

Municipalities in Rio Grande do Sul